Trechus krasnovi is a species of ground beetle in the subfamily Trechinae. It was described by Igor A. Belousov and Ilia I. Kabak in 1992.

References

krasnovi
Beetles described in 1992